2nd Cavalry, 2nd Cavalry Division, 2nd Cavalry Brigade or 2nd Cavalry Regiment may refer to:

Armies
 2nd Cavalry Army, of the Bolshevik Red Army in the Russian Civil War

Corps
 II Cavalry Corps (Grande Armée)
 II Cavalry Corps (German Empire)

Divisions
 2nd Cavalry Division (Australia)
 2nd Cavalry Division (Belgium)
 2nd Light Cavalry Division (France)
 2nd Cavalry Division (German Empire)
 2nd Cavalry Division (Reichswehr)
 2nd Indian Cavalry Division
 2nd Cavalry Division Emanuele Filiberto Testa di Ferro, of the Italian Army
 2nd Guard Cavalry division (Russian Empire)
 2nd Cavalry Division (United Kingdom)
 2nd Cavalry Division (United States)

Brigades
 2nd Cavalry Brigade (Australia)
 2nd Cavalry Brigade (Hungary)
 2nd (Sialkot) Cavalry Brigade, of the Indian Army
 2nd Cavalry Brigade (Poland)
 2nd Cavalry Brigade (United Kingdom)
 2nd Brigade Combat Team, 1st Cavalry Division (United States)

Regiments
 2nd Cavalry Regiment (Australia)
 2nd Regiment of Cavalry (Canada)
 2nd Foreign Cavalry Regiment, of the French Foreign Legion
 2nd Cavalry Regiment (Greece)
 2nd Madras Cavalry, of the East India Company
 2nd Cavalry Regiment (Portugal)
 2nd Cavalry Regiment (United States)
 2nd Regiment Alabama Volunteer Cavalry (Confederate), a Confederate regiment of the American Civil War
 2nd Arkansas Cavalry Regiment (Slemons'), a Confederate regiment of the American Civil War
 2nd Arkansas Cavalry Regiment (Union), a Union regiment of the American Civil War
 2nd California Cavalry Regiment, a Union regiment of the American Civil War
 2nd Colorado Cavalry Regiment, a Union regiment of the American Civil War
 2nd Florida Cavalry Regiment (Union), a Union regiment of the American Civil War
 2nd Regiment Indiana Cavalry, a Union regiment of the American Civil War
 2nd Regiment Illinois Volunteer Cavalry, a Union regiment of the American Civil War
 2nd Regiment Iowa Volunteer Cavalry, a Union regiment of the American Civil War
 2nd Regiment Kansas Volunteer Cavalry, a Union regiment of the American Civil War
 2nd Maryland Cavalry (Confederate), a Confederate regiment of the American Civil War
 2nd Regiment of Cavalry, Massachusetts Volunteers, a Union regiment of the American Civil War
 2nd Michigan Volunteer Cavalry Regiment, a Union regiment of the American Civil War
 2nd Minnesota Volunteer Cavalry Regiment, a Union regiment of the American Civil War
 2nd Nebraska Cavalry, a Union regiment of the American Civil War
 2nd Ohio Cavalry, a Union regiment of the American Civil War
 2nd Tennessee Cavalry Regiment, a Confederate regiment of the American Civil War
 2nd Virginia Cavalry, a Confederate regiment of the American Civil War
 2nd West Virginia Volunteer Cavalry Regiment, a Union regiment of the American Civil War
 2nd Regiment Wisconsin Volunteer Cavalry, a Union regiment of the American Civil War